Ust-Chizhapka is a rural locality (a selo) in Kargasoksky District of Tomsk Oblast, Russia.

In December 1931, 114 families lived in Ust-Chizhapka.

References

Rural localities in Tomsk Oblast